Jorge Castro Muñoz (born 20 January 1956) is a Chilean politician who was major of Valparaíso.

References

External links
 

1956 births
Living people
Independent Democratic Union politicians
21st-century Chilean politicians